Cariboo-Chilcotin can refer to one of two electoral districts in British Columbia, Canada:
Cariboo—Chilcotin, a federal electoral district in use from 1979 to 2003
Cariboo-Chilcotin (provincial electoral district), a provincial electoral district in use from 2009 to present